The 1989 British National Track Championships were a series of track cycling competitions held from 31 July – 6 August 1989 at the Saffron Lane Velodrome in Leicester. They were organised by the British Cycling Federation.

Medal summary

Men's Events

Women's Events

References

1989 in British sport
July 1989 sports events in the United Kingdom
August 1989 sports events in the United Kingdom